The John Olness House is a house in Kragnes Township, Clay County, Minnesota, just north of Moorhead on U.S. Route 75. The house is listed on the National Register of Historic Places as an example of a link between the farm communities and the farm-related businesses in Clay County. The architecture shows influences of the Queen Anne style, which stands out in Clay County because most buildings were in the local vernacular style. The owner, John Olness, was a successful farmer, and he also owned several businesses in the nearby community of Kragnes, including the local grain elevator and lumber yard.

The house received media attention during the 2009 Red River Flood. On March 24, 2009, owner Jeremy Kuipers discovered that the floodwaters had overcome a dike along a county road and surrounded the house. Dozens of volunteers filled sandbags and built a dike around the house. The floodwaters are expected to threaten the house for the next two weeks before subsiding.

References

External links
 A Friend's House, the current owner of the property

Houses on the National Register of Historic Places in Minnesota
Queen Anne architecture in Minnesota
Houses completed in 1902
Neoclassical architecture in Minnesota
Houses in Clay County, Minnesota
National Register of Historic Places in Clay County, Minnesota
1902 establishments in Minnesota